This article lists events that occurred during 1998 in Estonia.

Incumbents
President – Lennart Meri 
Prime Minister – Mart Siimann

Events
16 January – presidents of Baltic states signed a USA-Baltic Charter of Partnership.

18 March – death penalty was abolished in Estonia.

8 April – the headquarters of BALTRON minesweeping squadron was opened in Tallinn.

Births

Deaths

See also
 1998 in Estonian football
 1998 in Estonian television

References

 
1990s in Estonia
Estonia
Estonia
Years of the 20th century in Estonia